Markus Palmroth (born January 25, 1989) is a Finnish ice hockey defenceman. He is currently playing with HC TPS in the Finnish Liiga.

Palmroth made his SM-liiga debut playing with HC TPS during the 2010–11 season.

References

External links

1989 births
Living people
Sportspeople from Turku
Finnish ice hockey defencemen
HC TPS players
21st-century Finnish people